Mun Gyong-ae (born 8 April 1969) is a North Korean long-distance runner. She competed in the women's marathon at the 1992 Summer Olympics.

She has been compared to Choe Chang-sop, a male marathoner whose 1975 win at the Košice Peace Marathon marked the beginning of marathon running in North Korea in earnest. Mun had brought marathon back to the forefront in the country after a period of decline during the 1980s. Mun was awarded the title of Merited Athlete for her feats.

References

Works cited

External links
 

1969 births
Living people
Place of birth missing (living people)
North Korean female long-distance runners
North Korean female cross country runners
North Korean female marathon runners
Olympic female marathon runners
Olympic athletes of North Korea
Athletes (track and field) at the 1992 Summer Olympics
Asian Cross Country Championships winners
20th-century North Korean women
21st-century North Korean women